Revival is the nineteenth studio album of the Christian rock band Petra and their third praise album. It was released on November 20, 2001.

Album background

Revival was released amidst some major changes for the band. Three members had departed the band, so Bob Hartman decided to return from retirement to help cement the ground for their next album. Also, the band was dropped from their label (Word/Epic) which started a search for a suitable record label to launch their next album.

Inpop Records picked the band up and prepared for their next release. It was decided by both the band and producers that the best way to follow was a third praise album. They also decided that, instead of hiring new members, they would stay with remaining core members (John Schlitt, Louie Weaver, Bob Hartman) and use studio musicians for bass and keyboards.

The music features a more electric and synthesized sound, using heavy programming and sampling without sacrificing Hartman's guitar sounds or Weaver's rhythm. This is the only album of Petra that does not feature a song written by founder Bob Hartman.

Reception

The album was well received by audience and critics. John DiBiase, of Jesus Freak Hideout, called the album "a bold and brilliant step" for the band, and gave it 3.5 out of stars. Billboard magazine wrote "the group records songs brilliantly" and called the album "a reminder of why [Petra] will celebrate its 30th anniversary next year".

Track listing
 "Send Revival, Start With Me" (Words by Matt Redman) – 5:29
 "The Noise We Make" (Words by Jesse Reeves and Chris Tomlin) – 5:05
 "Oasis" (Words by John Hartley and Gary Sadler) – 3:56
 "The Prodigal's Song" (Words by Paul Oakley) – 4:16
 "Amazing Grace" (Words by Sadler, Hartley and Dwayne Larring) – 4:03
 "Jesus, Friend of Sinners" (Words by Oakley) – 3:32
 "Better Is One Day" (Words by Redman) – 4:36
 "Meet With Me" (Words by Lamont Hiebert) – 3:28
 "You Satisfy" (Words by Peter Gross and Ashlee White) – 4:26
 "We Want to See Jesus Lifted High" (Words by Doug Horley) – 3:02
 "How Long" (Words by Stuart Townend) – 4:06

Personnel 
Petra
 John Schlitt – lead vocals, backing vocals 
 Bob Hartman – guitars, additional backing vocals 
 Louie Weaver – drums

Additional musicians
 Jason Halbert – keyboards, programming, additional backing vocals
 Dwayne Larring – guitars
 Rick Cua – bass
 David Larring
 Kevin Walt
 David Angell – strings (1)
 Monisa Angell – strings (1)
 John Catchings – strings (1)
 David Davidson – strings (1), string arrangements (1)

Production
 Steve Ford – executive producer
 Jason Halbert – producer, engineer 
 Dwayne Larring – producer, engineer 
 Marc Chevalier – engineer at The Bennett House,  Franklin, Tennessee, The Refuge, Franklin, Tennessee, and House of Bob Studio, Franklin, Tennessee; The Junction, Pasadena, California
 Bob Hartman – additional engineer 
 David Streit – assistant engineer 
 Jacquire King – mixing at The Refuge, Franklin, Tennessee and EMI Studios, Brentwood, Tennessee
 Richard Dodd – mastering at Vital Studios, Nashville, Tennessee
 Dan Lessler – mastering assistant 
 TH – art direction, design, layout 
 Ben Pearson – photography 
 Robin Geary – hair, make-up 
 Dana Salsedo – stylist

References

2001 albums
Petra (band) albums
Inpop Records albums